Brignall village is located in an elevated position adjacent to the River Greta,
about 2 km upstream from Greta Bridge. The village is within the Teesdale district of south-west County Durham, England,
the nearest town is the market town of Barnard Castle.
The village is best known for the scenic valley section of the River Greta known as Brignall Banks,
which is a Site of Special Scientific Interest.

Natural England maps 

Maps for Brignall village and the surrounding area,
showing Access, Administrative Geographies and other criteria from Natural England:

 MAGiC MaP : Brignall village.

 MAGiC MaP : Brignall parish boundary. 

 MAGiC MaP : Brignall village – Listed buildings.  

 MAGiC MaP : Confluence of Brignall stream and River Greta.  

 MAGiC MaP : Brignall Banks SSSI. 

 MAGiC MaP : Brignall mill and ancient woodland.  

 MAGiC MaP : Greta Bridge and Roman fort. 

 MAGiC MaP : River Greta  " Meeting of the waters " .

Governance 

The population at the 2011 Census remained less than 100. Details are kept within the parish of Rokeby. It was historically located in the North Riding of Yorkshire but along with the rest of the former Startforth Rural District it was transferred to County Durham for administrative and ceremonial purposes on 1 April 1974, under the provisions of the Local Government Act 1972.

Name

Name history 
The name was recorded as Bringhenale in the Domesday Book of 1086 A.D.

British History Online: 
 Bringhenale, Bringhale (11th cent.)
 Brigenhall, Brigenhale (12th–13th cent.)

English surnames 
 Thomas de Briggenhale  appeared in the Poll Tax rolls for the County of Yorkshire in 1379.

The following English surnames might be derived from the place name: 

 Brignall
 Brignell
 Bricknall
 Bricknell

Toponym 

 . . . nook of land 

 Bridge by the nook of land between the stream and the river. 

Brignall : Brig..en..hale (12th-13th cent.), Brick..n..all (surname);

The name element Brig is from Medieval English brig ( " bridge " ).

The name element Brick is from Old English brycg ( " bridge " ).

The name element  ' en  '  is a common abbreviation of Medieval English atten  ( " at the, by the " ).

The name element hale is from Old English healh ( " corner, nook, secret place, corner of land left by the stream in a river valley " ).

Name examples 

Examples of place names that might have a similar etymology :

  Healaugh near Reeth, Swaledale : " Summer pasture by the nook of land between the Barney Beck and the River Swale ".
 Pecknell near Barnard Castle, Teesdale : " . . .nook of land between the Scur Beck and the River Tees ".
 Bracknell, Berkshire :  Braccan heal (942 A.D.) ,  Brakenhale ( Brak..en..hale )

History

Domesday book 
The village was recorded in the Domesday Book (1086 A.D.) as a settlement in the
 hundred of land of Count Alan
in the county of Yorkshire.

 Households: 16 villagers. 3 freemen. 6 smallholders. 1 men
 Ploughland: 152.5 ploughlands. 6 lord's plough teams. 12.5 men's plough teams.
 Other resources: Meadow 12 acres. Woodland 1 * 1 leagues. 1 fishery. 2 churches.

The list of villages recorded in the local area were described as partially  "waste" ,
possibly due to The Harrying of the North (1069–1070).

Art and culture 

The River Greta and the Brignall area were painted by John Sell Cotman and J. M. W. Turner amongst others.

Bird watching, walking and other outdoor activities can be pursued in the area.

References

Notes

Citations

Sources 

Books

Downloads

External links 

Villages in County Durham